Clarence "Chucky" Brown Jr. (born February 29, 1968) is an American men's college basketball coach and former professional basketball player.

A 6'7" forward from North Carolina State, Brown was selected by the Cleveland Cavaliers in the second round of the 1989 NBA draft. Brown shares (with Joe Smith, Tony Massenburg, Jim Jackson, and Ish Smith) the NBA record for the most teams played for during his NBA career — twelve: the Cavaliers, Los Angeles Lakers, New Jersey Nets, Dallas Mavericks, Houston Rockets (where he became champion in 1994–95), Phoenix Suns, Milwaukee Bucks, Atlanta Hawks, Charlotte Hornets, San Antonio Spurs, Golden State Warriors, and Sacramento Kings.  He retired with 4,125 career points.

In addition to the NBA teams, Brown had stints in the Continental Basketball Association and Italy's Panna Firenze. He played three games for Panna Firenze in 1992. The CBA saw Brown play for the Grand Rapids Hoops in 1993 and Yakima Sun Kings in 1994 and 1995. He became the second player to earn both an NBA ring and CBA ring in the same season.

Brown served as head coach of the World Basketball Association's Raleigh Knights during the summer of 2004, then served two seasons as an assistant coach for the Roanoke Dazzle of the NBA Development League. In 2006, Brown was named an assistant coach for the NBDL's Los Angeles D-Fenders, and was then promoted to head coach for one season. He is currently a scout for the New Orleans Pelicans. Brown lives in Cary, North Carolina with his wife and three daughters.

On April 2, 2019, Brown was named head coach of the men's varsity basketball team at West Johnston High School in Benson, North Carolina.

NBA career

Cleveland Cavaliers (1989–1991)

Brown was picked by the Cleveland Cavaliers with the 43rd overall pick in the 1989 NBA draft after playing for North Carolina State University. He would start 86 of his 149 games played with the organization. During his stint, he averaged 6.9 points per game, 2.8 rebounds per game, and 0.8 assists per game. On December 2, 1991, the Cavaliers waived Brown.

Los Angeles Lakers (1991–1992)

On December 5, three days after he was waived by the Cavaliers, Brown signed with the Los Angeles Lakers. He played 36 games for Los Angeles. He averaged 3.8 points per game, 2.1 rebounds per game, and 0.6 assists per game. He would play for Pallacanestro Firenze in Italy before signing with the New Jersey Nets.

New Jersey Nets (1992–1993)

On October 7, 1992, Brown signed with the New Jersey Nets. With the Nets, he would average 5.1 points per game, 3.0 rebounds per game, and 0.7 assists per game.

Dallas Mavericks (1993)

On November 12, 1993, Brown signed with the Dallas Mavericks. His tenure with Dallas would be short, as he would only play one game for them before being waived on November 23. In his only game with the Mavs, he scored three points, grabbed one rebound, and committed two fouls.

CBA career (1993–1995)

Brown played in the Continental Basketball Association for three years. He played for the Grand Rapids Hoops until being traded to the Yakima Sun Kings along with Reggie Jordan during the 1993–94 season. On October 4, 1994, Brown signed with the Miami Heat, but the Heat waived him before the start of the season. Brown would then play for the Yakima Sun Kings during the 1993–94 and 1994–95 seasons.  He averaged 21.3ppg and 5.5rpg in 31 games for the Sun Kings, and was a 1995 CBA All-Star, before getting called up to the Houston Rockets.  Brown won a CBA title and an NBA title, with the Rockets, that year.

Houston Rockets (1995–1996)

On February 2, 1995, he would sign the first of two 10-day contracts with the Houston Rockets, and he would sign with them for the remainder of the season on February 25. Brown would play in his most productive seasons in Houston, winning a championship in the 1994–95 season. During his tenure with the Rockets, he averaged 7.8 points per game, 5.4 rebounds per game, and 1.1 assists per game. During the 1995–96 season, he started all 82 games for the Rockets.

Phoenix Suns (1996)

On August 19, 1996, Brown, along with teammates Mark Bryant, Sam Cassell, and Robert Horry, were traded to the Phoenix Suns for Charles Barkley and a 1999 2nd-round pick. Brown played a total of 10 games with the Suns, averaging 3.4 points per game, 1.6 rebounds per game, and 0.4 assists per game.

Milwaukee Bucks (1996–1997)

On December 4, 1996, Brown was traded to the Milwaukee Bucks for Darrin Hancock and a 1997 2nd-round draft pick. He played 60 games for Milwaukee, averaging 2.8 points per game, 2.2 rebounds per game, and 0.4 assists per game.

Atlanta Hawks (1997–1998)

On October 2, 1997, Brown signed with the Atlanta Hawks. He would average 5.0 points per game, 2.4 rebounds per game, and 0.7 assists per game in his 77 games with the team.

Charlotte Hornets (1999)

On January 21, 1999, Brown signed with the Charlotte Hornets. During his stint with Charlotte, he would average the most points per game since the 1995–96 season. He averaged 8.5 points per game, 3.6 rebounds per game, and 1.2 assists per game.

San Antonio Spurs (1999–2000)

On October 1, 1999, Brown signed with the San Antonio Spurs. He started 27 of his 30 games with San Antonio, and he averaged 6.3 points per game, 2.6 rebounds per game, and 1.4 assists per game. He would eventually be waived by the Spurs on February 4, 2000.

Return to Charlotte (2000–2001)

On February 8, 2000, Brown signed with the Charlotte Hornets again. He would play 33 games in his second tenure with Charlotte, averaging 4.4 points per game, 2.7 rebounds per game, and 0.8 assists per game.

Golden State Warriors (2001)

On January 13, 2001, Brown signed the first of two 10-day contracts with the Golden State Warriors. In his 6 games with the Warriors, he would average 4.0 points per game, 3.0 rebounds per game, and 0.8 points per game. He would be waived by the Warriors on January 26.

Return to Cleveland (2001)

On January 29, Brown would return to the Cleveland Cavaliers, signing the first of two 10-day contracts with the team. He would eventually sign with the Cavs for the remainder of the season. He would average 3.9 points per game, 1.8 rebounds per game, and 0.3 assists per game in 20 games with Cleveland.

Sacramento Kings (2002)

Brown's final NBA season was spent with the Sacramento Kings. He signed the first of two 10-day contracts with them on February 26, 2002. He would later sign with Sacramento for the remainder of the season. In his 18 games with the Kings, he averaged 1.2 points per game, 1.8 rebounds per game, and 0.3 assists per game.

NBA career statistics

Regular season

|-
| align="left" | 1989–90
| align="left" | Cleveland
| 75 || 35 || 17.9 || .470 || .000 || .762 || 3.1 || 0.7 || 0.4 || 0.3 || 7.3
|-
| align="left" | 1990–91
| align="left" | Cleveland
| 74 || 51 || 20.1 || .524 || .000 || .701 || 2.9 || 1.1 || 0.4 || 0.3 || 8.5
|-
| align="left" | 1991–92
| align="left" | Cleveland
| 6 || 0 || 8.3 || .500 || .000 || .625 || 1.0 || 0.5 || 0.5 || 0.0 || 2.5
|-
| align="left" | 1991–92
| align="left" | Los Angeles
| 36 || 2 || 10.6 || .466 || .000 || .610 || 2.1 || 0.6 || 0.3 || 0.2 || 3.8
|-
| align="left" | 1992–93
| align="left" | New Jersey
| 77 || 20 || 15.4 || .483 || .000 || .724 || 3.0 || 0.7 || 0.3 || 0.3 || 5.1
|-
| align="left" | 1993–94
| align="left" | Dallas
| 1 || 0 || 10.0 || 1.000 || .000 || 1.000 || 1.0 || 0.0 || 0.0 || 0.0 || 3.0
|-
| align="left" | 1994–95
| align="left" | Houston
| 41 || 14 || 19.9 || .603 || .333 || .613 || 4.6 || 0.7 || 0.3 || 0.3 || 6.1
|-
| align="left" | 1995–96
| align="left" | Houston
| 82 || 82 || 24.6 || .541 || .125 || .693 || 5.4 || 1.1 || 0.6 || 0.5 || 8.6
|-
| align="left" | 1996–97
| align="left" | Phoenix
| 10 || 0 || 8.3 || .500 || .000 || .727 || 1.6 || 0.4 || 0.0 || 0.2 || 3.4
|-
| align="left" | 1996–97
| align="left" | Milwaukee
| 60 || 1 || 11.2 || .508 || .167 || .661 || 2.2 || 0.4 || 0.2 || 0.3 || 2.8
|-
| align="left" | 1997–98
| align="left" | Atlanta
| 77 || 8 || 15.6 || .433 || .250 || .724 || 2.4 || 0.7 || 0.3 || 0.2 || 5.0
|-
| align="left" | 1998–99
| align="left" | Charlotte
| 48 || 21 || 24.8 || .472 || .375 || .678 || 3.6 || 1.2 || 0.3 || 0.4 || 8.5
|-
| align="left" | 1999–00
| align="left" | San Antonio
| 30 || 27 || 20.1 || .466 || .333 || .806 || 2.6 || 1.4 || 0.3 || 0.3 || 6.3
|-
| align="left" | 1999–00
| align="left" | Charlotte
| 33 || 2 || 15.0 || .434 || .143 || .524 || 2.7 || 0.8 || 0.4 || 0.2 || 4.4
|-
| align="left" | 2000–01
| align="left" | Golden State
| 6 || 0 || 12.3 || .450 || .000 || .600 || 3.0 || 0.8 || 0.5 || 0.2 || 4.0
|-
| align="left" | 2000–01
| align="left" | Cleveland
| 20 || 2 || 13.3 || .413 || .000 || .667 || 1.8 || 0.3 || 0.3 || 0.3 || 3.9
|-
| align="left" | 2001–02
| align="left" | Sacramento
| 18 || 0 || 5.1 || .370 || .000 || .500 || 1.8 || 0.3 || 0.1 || 0.2 || 1.2
|- class="sortbottom"
| style="text-align:center;" colspan="2"| Career
| 694 || 265 || 17.2 || .491 || .227 || .699 || 3.1 || 0.8 || 0.3 || 0.3 || 5.9
|}

Playoffs

|-
| align="left" | 1991–92
| align="left" | Los Angeles
| 3 || 0 || 14.7 || .421 || .000 || .500 || 3.7 || 0.7 || 0.0 || 0.7 || 6.3
|-
| align="left" | 1992–93
| align="left" | New Jersey
| 4 || 0 || 15.5 || .409 || .000 || .857 || 2.3 || 0.3 || 0.8 || 0.8 || 6.0
|-
| align="left" | 1994–95
| align="left" | Houston
| 21 || 1 || 15.5 || .447 || .500 || .676 || 3.1 || 0.3 || 0.4 || 0.1 || 4.5
|-
| align="left" | 1995–96
| align="left" | Houston
| 8 || 8 || 21.0 || .556 || .000 || .833 || 3.0 || 0.6 || 0.4 || 0.0 || 8.1
|-
| align="left" | 1997–98
| align="left" | Atlanta
| 4 || 0 || 12.5 || .467 || .500 || .500 || 1.5 || 1.0 || 0.0 || 0.0 || 4.0
|-
| align="left" | 2001–02
| align="left" | Sacramento
| 1 || 0 || 1.0 || .000 || .000 || .000 || 1.0 || 0.0 || 0.0 || 0.0 || 0.0
|- class="sortbottom"
| style="text-align:center;" colspan="2"| Career
| 41 || 9 || 15.9 || .469 || .400 || .714 || 2.8 || 0.5 || 0.4 || 0.2 || 5.3
|}

Transactions
 June 27, 1989 – Drafted with the second round, 43rd overall pick by the Cleveland Cavaliers.
 December 2, 1991 – Waived by the Cavaliers.
 December 5, 1991 – Signed by the Los Angeles Lakers.
 September 29, 1992 – Rights renounced by the Lakers.
 October 7, 1992 – Signed by the New Jersey Nets.
 November 12, 1993 – Signed as a free agent by the Dallas Mavericks.
 November 23, 1993 – Waived by the Mavericks.
 October 4, 1994 – Signed by the Miami Heat.
 November 1, 1994 – Waived by the Heat (did not play in the NBA for them).
 February 1, 1995 – Signed by the Houston Rockets to a 10-day contract (re-signed on February 12 and 24 for the rest of the season).
 October 3, 1995 – Re-signed by the Rockets.
 August 19, 1996 – Traded by the Rockets with Robert Horry, Sam Cassell and Mark Bryant to the Phoenix Suns for Charles Barkley and a 1999 second round draft pick.
 December 4, 1996 – Traded by the Suns to the Milwaukee Bucks for Darrin Hancock and a conditional second round draft pick.
 October 2, 1997 – Signed as a free agent by the Atlanta Hawks.
 January 21, 1999 – Signed as a free agent by the Charlotte Hornets.
 October 1, 1999 – Signed as a free agent by the San Antonio Spurs.
 February 4, 2000 – Waived by the Spurs.
 February 8, 2000 – Signed by the Hornets to a 10-day contract.
 January 13, 2001 – Signed by the Golden State Warriors to a 10-day contract (re-signed on January 23, waived on January 26).
 January 29, 2001 – Signed by the Cleveland Cavaliers to a 10-day contract (re-signed on February 12 and 22 for the rest of the season).
 February 26, 2002 – Signed by the Sacramento Kings to a 10-day contract (re-signed on March 8 and 18 for the rest of the season).

References

External links

1968 births
Living people
African-American basketball players
African-American basketball coaches
American expatriate basketball people in Italy
American men's basketball coaches
American men's basketball players
Atlanta Hawks players
Basketball coaches from New York (state)
Basketball players from New York City
Basketball coaches from North Carolina
Basketball players from North Carolina
Charlotte Hornets players
Cleveland Cavaliers draft picks
Cleveland Cavaliers players
Dallas Mavericks players
Golden State Warriors players
Grand Rapids Hoops players
Houston Rockets players
Los Angeles D-Fenders coaches
Los Angeles Lakers players
Milwaukee Bucks players
NC State Wolfpack men's basketball players
New Jersey Nets players
Phoenix Suns players
Power forwards (basketball)
Roanoke Dazzle coaches
Sacramento Kings players
San Antonio Spurs players
Small forwards
Yakima Sun Kings players
People from Cary, North Carolina